A by-election was held for the Australian House of Representatives seat of Adelaide on 13 June 1908. This was triggered by the death of former Premier of South Australia and federal Protectionist Party MP Charles Kingston.

The by-election was won by Labor candidate Ernest Roberts, after the seat was previously won uncontested by Kingston at the 1903 and 1906 elections. Voting was not compulsory in 1908.

Alexander McLachlan was an independent Anti-Socialist Party candidate.

Results

See also
 List of Australian federal by-elections

References

1908 elections in Australia
South Australian federal by-elections
1900s in Adelaide
20th century in Adelaide